Richard Cockburn Maclaurin (June 5, 1870 – January 15, 1920) was a Scottish-born U.S. educator and mathematical physicist. He was made president of MIT in 1909, and held the position until his death in 1920.

During his tenure as president of MIT, the Institute moved across the Charles River from Boston to its present campus in Cambridge. In Maclaurin's honor, the buildings that surround Killian Court on the oldest part of the campus are sometimes called the Maclaurin Buildings.

Earlier, he was a foundation professor of the then Victoria College of the University of New Zealand from 1899 to 1907. A collection of lecture theatres at the Kelburn campus of that university were named after him. He was also a professor at Columbia University from 1907 to 1908.

Personal
Maclaurin was born in Scotland, and was related to the noted Scottish mathematician Colin Maclaurin. He emigrated to New Zealand with his family at the age of four. In 1904 he married Alice Young of Auckland, and they had two sons. His brother James Scott Maclaurin (1864–1939) was a noted chemist, who invented a process for extracting gold with cyanide.

Education
 University Entrance Scholar, 1887, Auckland Grammar School
 B.Sc. (Hons), Mathematics, 1890, Auckland University College.
 BA, 1895 (12th wrangler); LL.D., 1904, St John's College, University of Cambridge.

Publications
 On the Nature and Evidence of Title to Realty, 1901
 Treatise on the Theory of Light, 1908

Honors
 Smith's Prize in Mathematics, 1896
 Yorke Prize in Law, University of Cambridge, 1898

References

External links

 
 'MACLAURIN, Richard Cockburn', from An Encyclopaedia of New Zealand, edited by A. H. McLintock, originally published in 1966.
 'Richard Cockburn Maclaurin, 1870–1920', from History of the Office of the MIT President, Institute Archives, MIT Libraries, October 2004.
Maclaurin in Mathematics at Victoria University College

1870 births
1920 deaths
Presidents of the Massachusetts Institute of Technology
University of Auckland alumni
People educated at Auckland Grammar School
Academic staff of the Victoria University of Wellington
Alumni of St John's College, Cambridge
Richard
American mathematicians